The 2017 Women's World Floorball Championships was the 11th World Championships in women's floorball. The tournament took place in Bratislava in Slovakia between 1–9 December 2017. Sixteen teams participated and the competition was won by Sweden.

Qualification

All teams, apart from the host country (Slovakia), will have to qualify for the Final Round via the qualifications, and there will be a total of 6 qualification groups - one in the Americas, one in Asia-Oceania and four in Europe. Thailand participated in the women's event for the first-ever time.

Venues
The games of the 2017 Floorball World Championship will take place in Bratislava in the Ondrej Nepela Arena and in HANT Arena.

Preliminary round

Group A

Group B

Group C

Group D

Knockout stage

Playoff round

Quarterfinals

Semifinals

Bronze-medal game

Final

Placement round

13th–16th-place semifinals

9th–12th-place semifinals

5th–8th-place semifinals

15th-place game

13th-place game

11th-place game

9th-place game

7th-place game

5th-place game

Statistics

Scoring leaders

GP = Games played; G = Goals; A = Assists; Pts = Points; PIM = Penalties In Minutes
Source: IFF

Tournament awards
 MVP:  Emelie Wibron
 Best goalkeeper:  Tiltu Siltanen
 Best defender:  Moa Tschöp
 Best defender:  My Kippilä
 Best forward:  Emelie Wibron
 Best centre:  Corin Rüttimann
 Best forward:  Paulína Hudáková

Final ranking

External links
Official site

References

2017, women's
International sports competitions hosted by Slovakia
2017 in floorball
Women's World Floorball Championships
Sports competitions in Bratislava
2010s in Bratislava
Floorball in Slovakia
2017 in Slovak women's sport